Setti David Warren (born August 25, 1970) is an American politician. He served as Mayor of Newton, Massachusetts, a suburb of Boston, and is a former Democratic candidate for United States Senate in 2012. He is the first popularly elected African-American mayor in Massachusetts.

Warren ran for Governor of Massachusetts in the 2018 election, announcing his candidacy on May 20, 2017. Warren withdrew from the race on April 26, 2018, citing fundraising and financial issues.

Early life and education
Warren, along with his twin sister Makeda, was born in 1970 to their parents Joseph and Elpidia (née Lopez) Warren. His father, Joseph D. Warren, was an advisor for Massachusetts Governor Michael Dukakis's 1988 presidential campaign, and worked in the African-American studies department at Northeastern University before his death in 2010. His mother, Elpidia Lopez, is a retired social worker. He also has a stepmother, Martha L. (Walker) Warren. His younger sister Kara, who had struggled with severe asthma throughout her life, died in November 2005 at the age of 27.

Warren completed elementary school at the private school Jackson Walnut Park in Newton and then attended Newton North High School, where he was the class president for all four years, and while he attended Boston College, he was also elected student body president. He graduated with a Bachelor of Arts in history in 1993. He received a Juris Doctor from Suffolk University Law School's night classes in 2006, although he has not taken the bar exam to practice law.

Early career and Navy service
After graduating from college, Warren worked for two years with his family's consulting business. In 1995 he joined the New England branch of U.S. President Bill Clinton's re-election campaign. From 1996 to 2000 he worked in several White House Offices under Clinton: the Advance Office, Cabinet Affairs Office, and the Social Office. He served as New England regional director of the Federal Emergency Management Agency (FEMA) from 2000 to 2001, where he implemented a performance management system for the office. He then worked for two years in fundraising at Boston College.

Warren enlisted in the United States Naval Reserve in 2003. Around the same time, he joined the presidential campaign of U.S. Senator John Kerry, where he was his trip director. After the election, Warren became deputy director of Kerry's Massachusetts office. Around this time, he served partial terms on the Newton Community Preservation Committee and Economic Development Commission. He resigned each mid-term as his career with Kerry developed.

In October 2007, Warren left Kerry's office to serve as Naval intelligence specialist in Iraq. Before leaving, he assembled a committee to explore a candidacy for mayor of Newton. While he was on training in South Carolina in late 2007, his committee filed papers for his election.

Mayor of Newton

Newton Mayor David Cohen announced that he would not seek re-election in May 2008, leaving an open field, which had not occurred in Newton since 1971. Warren, on leave from Iraq in June 2008, declared his intent to run. His campaign was forestalled until he completed his tour of duty the following October, as Department of Defense regulations forbid active duty service men from seeking elected office. In November 2008, Warren formally announced his candidacy, pledging to "protect the sacred trust between the citizens in this city and public servants."

During the campaign Warren emphasized his record with FEMA, including the management of civil servants. Warren was elected November 3, 2009 in a vote of 11,233 to 10,772, defeating State Representative Ruth Balser. Warren took office on January 1, 2010.

Warren faced re-election on November 5, 2013. The field of four candidates was narrowed down to two in a primary election on September 17, 2013. In the general election, Warren defeated Newton Alderman Ted Hess-Mahan.

Engine 6 Controversy 
In June 2013, Warren announced that he would block funding for a controversial proposal to construct affordable housing on Beacon Street in Waban for formerly homeless people. The proposal, called Engine 6, was privately developed and expected to cost $3.1 million; developers had requested about $1.4 million in federal funds managed by the city of Newton to move ahead, but Warren's withdrawal of funding halted future plans for construction.

U.S. Senate campaign, 2012 
On May 9, 2011, Setti Warren announced his candidacy to represent Massachusetts in the United States Senate in the 2012 election. On September 29, 2011, Warren dropped out of the race, declaring "I no longer believe I have a clear path to victory in this race". He endorsed eventual Democratic nominee, Elizabeth Warren.  He later expressed regret at running for Senate just two years into his mayoral term, saying "I ran too early."

Massachusetts gubernatorial campaign, 2018 
On May 20, 2017, Warren announced he was running for Governor of Massachusetts.  In front of his home and surrounded by family, friends and supporters, Warren called income inequality the "defining issue of our generation."  He has called for single-payer healthcare, free tuition, a new millionaire's tax, and a high-speed rail project across Massachusetts.

Warren ended his campaign on April 26, 2018, stating "We took a hard look at the numbers and what it would take to run a winning campaign against the incumbent governor. I just saw the challenge was insurmountable, based on the ability to raise the money and the resources." He has declined to endorse either of his former opponents for the Democratic nomination.

Personal life 
Warren's first marriage ended in divorce. Warren later married Elizabeth Tasker "Tassy" Plummer on August 12, 2006, with John Kerry serving as his groomsman. A Newton native, Tassy worked on the Kerry presidential campaign, where she met Warren. , Tassy is chief programs officer at the Harvard University Center on the Developing Child. Together they have one daughter named Abigail and a son named John.

References

External links 

 Newton, MA - Executive Office 
 Setti Warren - Democrat for Governor

1970 births
Living people
Hispanic and Latino American mayors
African-American mayors in Massachusetts
United States Navy personnel of the Iraq War
Morrissey College of Arts & Sciences alumni
Massachusetts Democrats
Mayors of Newton, Massachusetts
Suffolk University Law School alumni
United States Navy sailors
United States Navy reservists
Candidates in the 2018 United States elections
Candidates in the 2012 United States elections